Terri Brown (born September 27, 1947) is an American athlete. She competed in the women's high jump at the 1964 Summer Olympics.

References

External links
 

1947 births
Living people
Athletes (track and field) at the 1964 Summer Olympics
American female high jumpers
Olympic track and field athletes of the United States
Track and field athletes from Birmingham, Alabama
21st-century American women